John Denny (1846 – November 26, 1901) was a Buffalo Soldier in the United States Army and a recipient of America's highest military decoration—the Medal of Honor—for his actions in the Indian Wars of the western United States.

Career
Denny joined the Army from Elmira, New York in 1869, and, by September 18, 1879, was serving as a First Sergeant in Company C of the 9th Cavalry Regiment. On that day, his unit participated in an engagement against Chief Victorio and his band of Apaches at Las Animas Canyon, New Mexico, and Denny "[r]emoved a wounded comrade, under a heavy fire, to a place of safety." For his actions, Sergeant Denny was awarded the Medal of Honor fifteen years later, in January 1895.

Denny retired from the Army in September 1897 as a corporal. He received a pension but also worked at the Fort Robinson post exchange. He moved to the US Soldiers' Home in Washington, D.C. sometime in or after 1899 and died there in 1901. Denny was buried at the United States Soldiers' and Airmen's Home National Cemetery in Washington, D.C.

Medal of Honor citation
Rank and organization: Sergeant, Company C, 9th U.S. Cavalry. Place and date: At Las Animas Canyon, N. Mex., September 18, 1879. Entered service at: 1867 Elmira, N.Y. Birth: Big Flats, N.Y. Date of issue: November 27, 189i.

Citation:

Removed a wounded comrade, under a heavy fire, to a place of safety.

See also

List of Medal of Honor recipients
List of Medal of Honor recipients for the Indian Wars
List of African-American Medal of Honor recipients

Notes

References

1846 births
1901 deaths
American people of the Indian Wars
United States Army Medal of Honor recipients
United States Army soldiers
Buffalo Soldiers
Burials at United States Soldiers' and Airmen's Home National Cemetery
Military personnel from New York (state)
American Indian Wars recipients of the Medal of Honor
People from Big Flats, New York